Malaysia competed at the 2011 World Championships in Athletics from 27 August to 4 September in Daegu, South Korea.
A team of 2 athletes was
announced to represent the country
in the event.

Results

Men

Women

References

External links
 Official local organising committee website
 Official IAAF competition website

Nations at the 2011 World Championships in Athletics
World Championships in Athletics
Malaysia at the World Championships in Athletics